Neurocytoma is a type of nervous system benign tumor which is primarily derived from nervous tissue.

See also
 Central neurocytoma

References

External links 

brain tumor